The 1992–93 Memphis State Tigers men's basketball team represented Memphis State University as a member of the Great Midwest Conference during the 1992–93 NCAA Division I men's basketball season. The Tigers were led by head coach Larry Finch and played their home games at the Pyramid Arena in Memphis, Tennessee.

The Tigers received an at-large bid to the 1992 NCAA tournament as No. 10 seed in the Southeast region. Memphis State fell to No. 7 seed Western Kentucky in the opening round. The team finished with a 20–12 record (7–3 Great Midwest).

Roster

Schedule and results

|-
!colspan=9 style= | Regular Season

|-
!colspan=9 style= | Great Midwest Conference Tournament

|-
!colspan=9 style= | NCAA Tournament

Rankings

Awards and honors
Penny Hardaway – GMC Player of the Year (2x)

Team players in the 1993 NBA draft

References

Memphis Tigers men's basketball seasons
Memphis State
Memphis State
1993 in sports in Tennessee
1992 in sports in Tennessee